Yarra may refer to:
 Yarra River, a river in southern Victoria, Australia on which the city of Melbourne was founded
 Yarra Trams, a public transport company specialising in trams in Melbourne, Australia
 City of Yarra, a local government area in Victoria, Australia
 South Yarra, a suburb of Melbourne, Victoria
 Yarra, New South Wales, a locality near Goulburn, New South Wales
 Yarra Creek, Tasmania, a locality
 Division of Yarra, an abolished Australian federal electoral division
HMAS Yarra, name of Australian naval ships
Yarra Park, a park that surrounds the MCG and other ovals in Victoria (Australia).

See also
Jarrah (disambiguation)